Baker High School may refer to one of these secondary schools in the United States:

 Baker High School (Alabama)
 Baker High School (California), member of the Hi-Lo League
 Baker High School (Georgia)
 Baker High School (Louisiana)
 Baker High School (Montana), attended by Shann Schillinger
 Baker High School (Oregon)
 Charles W. Baker High School (Baldwinsville, New York)
 George F. Baker High School (Tuxedo, New York)
 Ida S. Baker High School (Cape Coral, Florida)

See also 
 Baker County High School (disambiguation)